Demi Rose Mawby (born March 27, 1995) is a British glamour model, social media personality, and former DJ. , she has over 19.9 million followers on Instagram.

Early life and education
Mawby was born on March 27, 1995, in Birmingham, England and went to John Willmott School for secondary school. She was also a student at Walsall College.

Career
Mawby joined Instagram at age 18. She has an account on OnlyFans, an internet content subscription service based in London. In May 2015, she performed as a model in DJ Khaled's song video, "How Many Times". She was briefly contracted with Taz's Angels, an American group of models, and left the group in November 2015 to return to the UK.

Mawby has appeared in several magazines such as WorldStarHipHop, FHM, Nuts, Zoo, and others. She has landed the cover of Sixty6 magazine in December 2016. She is also a global ambassador of PrettyLittleThing, a UK-based fashion retailer.

Personal life
In 2016, Mawby was dating American rapper Tyga. Mawby's father, Barrie Mawby, died in October 2018 from cancer, and her mother, Christine Mawby, died from a stomach infection in June 2019.

Mawby is bisexual, stating, "I went through a phase of liking girls more than guys. Now I'm more into guys. It just depends."

References

External links

 
 

1995 births
DJs from Birmingham
English female models
English women DJs
Glamour models
Living people
OnlyFans creators
People from Birmingham, West Midlands
Social media influencers